The Township of Hamilton is one of twenty-nine townships in Lonoke County, Arkansas, USA. As of the 2010 census, its population was 148.

Geography

Cemetery
The township contains Hamilton Cemetery.

Major routes
 Arkansas Highway 13
 Arkansas Highway 232

References

External links
 Hamilton township, Lonoke County, Arkansas, at City-Data.com

Townships in Lonoke County, Arkansas
Townships in Arkansas